The 2019–20 LEB Plata season was the 20th season of the Spanish basketball third league. It started on 21 September 2019 with the first round of the regular season and was curtailed on 25 May 2020 due to the COVID-19 pandemic.

Format changes
On 8 June 2019, the General Assembly of the Spanish Basketball Federation agreed to expand the promotion playoffs to eight teams, being these from the second to the ninth qualified of the Group A1 of the second stage and the winner of the Group A2.

In addition, every team must have always playing at least one Spanish player.

Teams

Promotion and relegation (pre-season)
A total of 24 teams contested the league, including 15 sides from the 2018–19 season, three relegated from the 2018–19 LEB Oro and six promoted from the 2018–19 Liga EBA. On July 10, 2019, Círculo Gijón swapped place with Grupo Eleyco Baskonia B, JAFEP Fundación Globalcaja La Roda swapped place with Isover Basket Azuqueca, Gran Canaria B swapped place with NCS Alcobendas, and CB Benicarló and CB Marbella achieved the vacancies of Sáenz Horeca Araberri and Movistar Estudiantes B.

Teams relegated from LEB Oro
CB Prat
Barça B
Sáenz Horeca Araberri (resigned)

Teams promoted from Liga EBA
Ilerdauto Nissan Pardinyes Lleida
CAT&REST Intragas-Clima CDP
UBU Tizona
Enerdrink UDEA Algeciras
NCS Alcobendas (resigned to promotion)
Movistar Estudiantes B (resigned to promotion)

Teams relegated to Liga EBA
Círculo Gijón (swapped place with Grupo Eleyco Baskonia B)
CB Extremadura Plasencia
Ávila Auténtica Carrefour "El Bulevar"
CB Vic Universitat de Vic
JAFEP Fundación Globalcaja La Roda (swapped place with Isover Basket Azuqueca)
Quesería La Antigua CB Tormes

Teams that applied to participate
CB Benicarló
Gran Canaria B (swapped place with NCS Alcobendas)
CB Marbella

Venues and locations

Season summary
On March 10, 2020, the Government of Spain decreed that all games would be played behind closed doors due to the COVID-19 pandemic. On March 12, 2020, the Spanish Basketball Federation postponed all the games of the next two weeks. On March 18, 2020, the Spanish Basketball Federation extended the postponement of the games until March 29 due to the state of alarm. On March 25, 2020, the Spanish Basketball Federation extended the postponement of the games until April 12 due to the extension of state of alarm.

On May 8, 2020, the Spanish Basketball Federation finished prematurely the regular season due to force majeure with the following decisions:
Relegations to Liga EBA were revoked.
Promotions to LEB Oro remained. Likewise, the promotions from Liga EBA remained, although, due to exceptional circumstances, the Spanish Basketball Federation reserved the right to expand the league to 28 teams in the next season, if necessary.
The top team from Group A1 as of March 8 would promote directly to LEB Oro.
Promotion playoffs would be played, as long as, on May 25, the Spanish Basketball Federation had the confirmation that it could be played before June 30, setting the health of the players as an absolute priority, and provided that it was certain that health authorities and clubs could comply with approved health protocols.
Promotion playoffs would be as follows:
One game would be played between the 5th and 6th qualified teams of the Group A1 as of March 8. The winner of the game would play a game against the 2nd qualified team of the Group A1 as of March 8, and the winner of this game would promote directly to LEB Oro.
One game would be played between the 3rd and 4th qualified teams of the Group A1 as of March 8. The winner would promote directly to LEB Oro.
If the sanitary conditions would make it impossible to play the promotion playoffs, the three top teams from Group A1 as of March 8 would promote to LEB Oro.

On May 25, 2020, the Spanish Basketball Federation cancelled the promotion playoffs and approved the promotions to LEB Oro of the three top teams.

First phase

Group East

League table

Positions by round
The table lists the positions of teams after completion of each round. In order to preserve chronological evolvements, any postponed matches are not included in the round at which they were originally scheduled, but added to the full round they were played immediately afterwards.

Results

Group West

League table

Positions by round
The table lists the positions of teams after completion of each round. In order to preserve chronological evolvements, any postponed matches are not included in the round at which they were originally scheduled, but added to the full round they were played immediately afterwards.

Results

Second phase

Group A1

League table

Positions by round
The table lists the positions of teams after completion of each round. In order to preserve chronological evolvements, any postponed matches are not included in the round at which they were originally scheduled, but added to the full round they were played immediately afterwards.

Results

Group A2

League table

Positions by round
The table lists the positions of teams after completion of each round. In order to preserve chronological evolvements, any postponed matches are not included in the round at which they were originally scheduled, but added to the full round they were played immediately afterwards.

Results

Copa LEB Plata
The Copa LEB Plata was played on 28 December 2019, by the first qualified team of each group after the end of the first half of the season (round 11 of first phase). The champion of the cup would play the promotion playoffs against the worst qualified if it would finished the league between the second and the fifth qualified of the Group A1.

Teams qualified

Game

Awards
All official awards of the 2019–20 LEB Plata season.

Copa LEB Plata MVP

Source:

Player of the round

First phase

Second phase

Notes

References

External links
 Official website 

LEB2
LEB Plata seasons
LEB Plata